The United States competed at the 1928 Summer Olympics in Amsterdam, Netherlands. 280 competitors, 236 men and 44 women, took part in 96 events in 15 sports.

Medalists

Athletics

Boxing

Men's Flyweight (– 50.8 kg)
 Hyman Miller
 First Round — Lost to Robert Sartos (BEL), points

Men's Heavyweight (+ 79.4 kg)
 Alexander Kaletchetz
 First Round — Bye
 Quarterfinals — Lost to Sverre Sørsdal (NOR), KO-1

Cycling

Four cyclists, all men, represented the United States in 1928.

Individual road race
 Chester Nelsen, Sr.
 Henry O'Brien, Jr.
 Peter Smessaert
 Charles Westerholm

Team road race
 Chester Nelsen, Sr.
 Henry O'Brien, Jr.
 Peter Smessaert

Diving

Equestrian

Fencing

16 fencers, 14 men and 2 women, represented the United States in 1928.

Men's foil
 Joe Levis
 George Calnan
 Dernell Every

Men's team foil
 George Calnan, René Peroy, Joe Levis, Harold Rayner, Henry Breckinridge, Dernell Every

Men's épée
 George Calnan
 Allen Milner
 Edward Barnett

Men's team épée
 Arthur Lyon, George Calnan, Allen Milner, Harold Rayner, Henry Breckinridge, Edward Barnett

Men's sabre
 John Huffman
 Norman Cohn-Armitage
 Nickolas Muray

Men's team sabre
 Ervin Acel, Norman Cohn-Armitage, John Huffman, Arthur Lyon, Nickolas Muray, Harold Van Buskirk

Women's foil
 Marion Lloyd
 Irma Hopper

Football

Results
United States 2-11 Argentina

Roster
Albert Cooper
John Duffy
Harry Smith
Francis Ryan
Jack Lyons
Robert Aitken
William Findlay
Jack Deal
Rudy Kuntner
Henry Carroll
Jimmy Gallagher

Coach: George Burford

Gymnastics

Modern pentathlon

Three male pentathletes represented the United States in 1928.

 Aubrey Newman
 Richard Mayo
 Peter Hains

Rowing

Sailing

Swimming

Water Polo

Wrestling

Art competitions

References

Oly
Nations at the 1928 Summer Olympics
1928